Dom Booth (born 6 August 2000) is a Welsh rugby union player, currently playing for Pro14 and European Rugby Champions Cup side Scarlets. His preferred position is hooker.

Scarlets
Booth was named in the Scarlets first-team squad ahead of the 2020–21 Pro14. He made his Scarlets debut in Round 4 of the 2020–21 Pro14 against Edinburgh.

References

External links
itsrugby.co.uk Profile

2000 births
Living people
Rugby union hookers
Rugby union players from Pembrokeshire
Scarlets players
Welsh rugby union players